Cedar is an unincorporated community in Butler Township, DeKalb County, Indiana.

History
Cedar was named after Cedar Creek. The post office was discontinued in 1914.

Geography

References

Unincorporated communities in DeKalb County, Indiana
Unincorporated communities in Indiana